Tubman may refer to:

Bob Tubman, Australian rugby league footballer
Emily Harvie Thomas Tubman, American philanthropist
Harriet Tubman, African American abolitionist and political activist
William Tubman, President of Liberia
Winston Tubman, Liberian politician

in law
Tubman, a senior barrister of the historic Exchequer of pleas of England and Wales.